The Cemitério dos Ingleses, Gamboa is a cemetery in Gamboa, Rio de Janeiro in Brazil. It is also known as the English Cemetery or the British Cemetery Gamboa.

History
John VI of Portugal ceded two and a half acres of land near the shore of Guanabara Bay to the British in 1809. The British Ambassador to the Emperor's court (Percy Smythe, 6th Viscount Strangford), founded the cemetery. The first burial was in 1811.

There are 8 World War I and 4 World War II Commonwealth war graves in the cemetery.

Location
The cemetery is located in Rua da Gamboa, in the neighborhood of Gamboa, Rio de Janeiro.

References

External links
 The British Burial Fund – Gamboa – The British & Commonwealth Society of Rio
 

1811 establishments in Brazil
Burial sites of the Seymour family
Cemeteries established in the 1810s
Ingleses
Commonwealth War Graves Commission cemeteries in Brazil